The following is the list of 145 paintings indexed as autograph by Frans Hals, written by the art historian and Hals specialist Claus Grimm in 1989. The list is by catalogue number and is more or less in order of creation, starting from around 1610 when Hals began painting on his own. Most of these works are still considered autograph, though one has since been reattributed to Judith Leyster. In addition to this list, Grimm added comments and additional entries to Seymour Slive's lists of lost and doubtful paintings. He also rejected several Slive attributions, making his list is considerably shorter. The autograph catalogue entries are as follows:

See also
 Frans Hals catalogue raisonné, 1974 – earlier catalogue by Seymour Slive with 222 autograph paintings
 Marriage pendant portraits by Frans Hals – a list showing the marriage pendants side-by-side
 List of paintings by Frans Hals – updated (but still incomplete) list

Sources

 Frans Hals, by Seymour Slive, a catalogue raisonné of Hals works by Seymour Slive: Volume Three, the catalogue, National Gallery of Art: Kress Foundation, Studies in the History of European Art, London: Phaidon Press, 1974
 Frans Hals, by Seymour Slive (editor), with contributions by Pieter Biesboer, Martin Bijl, Karin Groen and Ella Hendriks, Michael Hoyle, Frances S. Jowell, Koos Levy-van Halm and Liesbeth Abraham, Bianca M. Du Mortier, Irene van Thiel-Stroman,  Prestel-Verlag, Munich & Mercatorfonds, Antwerp, 1989, 
Frans Hals: het gehele oeuvre, by Claus Grimm, Amsterdam, Meulenhoff/Landshoff, 1990
 Frans Hals in the RKD

 List
Hals, Frans